John Joseph Binienda, Sr. (June 22, 1947 – August 22, 2014) was an American state legislator serving in the Massachusetts House of Representatives. He was a Worcester resident and a member of the Democratic Party. After serving 28 years in the House, Binienda died in 2014. He went to Quinsigamond Community College, Worcester State University, and then taught school in Leicester, Massachusetts. Binienda, who suffered from kidney disease and diabetes, was not seeking reelection due to his health. He had one daughter and two sons.

See also
 1993–1994 Massachusetts legislature
 Massachusetts's 17th Worcester House district

References

 John J. Binienda. Massachusetts General Court.

Democratic Party members of the Massachusetts House of Representatives
Politicians from Worcester, Massachusetts
Worcester State University alumni
1947 births
2014 deaths